"Finally" is a song by American house music project Kings of Tomorrow featuring Julie McKnight. The song was written by Jason Sealee and produced by Sandy Rivera. In the United Kingdom, the song was released as a single in 2001 and peaked at number 24 on the UK Singles Chart. In the United States, the song reached number 17 on the Billboard Dance Club Songs chart in 2002. The song was nominated for Record of the Year at the DanceStar USA Awards in 2002. 

"Love Story (vs. Finally)", a remix of Layo & Bushwacka!'s 2002 dance hit "Love Story", interpolates Julie McKnight's vocals from the Kings of Tomorrow song.

In 2022, the song was remade by Swedish House Mafia and Alicia Keys. Swedish House Mafia first previewed the song at Chase Center in San Francisco on their Paradise Again World Tour.

Charts

References

2001 singles
2001 songs
Alicia Keys songs
Swedish House Mafia songs